Shenzhen Reservoir is a reservoir located in Luohu District, in southeastern Shenzhen in the southern China. Shenzhen Reservoir is the largest man-made lake in Shenzhen. It belongs to the first grade water source protection area and is part of Shenzhen's water supply network. It borders on Donghu Park and Fairy Lake Botanical Garden and is surrounded by Mount Wutong. The reservoir discharges into Sham Chun River, the natural border between Hong Kong and Mainland China, together with the Sha Tau Kok River.

History
Shenzhen Reservoir was built in March 1965 for irrigation and drinking water purposes.

Public access

Shenzhen reservoir is open to the public from 6:00 pm to 9:00 pm every day.

Shenzhen Reservoir is a popular recreation area for hiking and tourism.

Nearby attractions include Donghu Park and Fairy Lake Botanical Garden.

Transportation
Take bus No. 3, 17, 23, 29, 211, 308, 320, 351 to Shuiku Bus Stop.

References

External links

Reservoirs in Shenzhen
Luohu District
Tourist attractions in Shenzhen
1965 establishments in China